The Phoenix – S K Club is one of six male final clubs at Harvard College, tracing its earliest roots to 1895.  It consists of an undergraduate body of male upperclassmen at Harvard College who are not members of any other Final Club and alumni members.  It is a body which has resulted from the amalgamation and reorganization of various individual clubs, namely the Sphinx, Kalumet, and Phoenix Clubs.  The Phoenix – S K is currently located at 72 Mt. Auburn Street in Cambridge near Harvard Square, which is a property protected by the Cambridge Historical Commission.

History
The Sphinx Club grew out of a small secret society founded in 1897.  Originally known by several names, in 1900, almost all the members of this organization joined together in forming the Sphinx Club, located at 1172 Massachusetts Avenue, then 55 Mt. Auburn Street.  In 1903 the Club moved to 72 Mt. Auburn Street, the current site of the Phoenix – S K Club.

The Kalumet Club was started by members of the Harvard chapter of Beta Theta Pi, many in the class of 1900, and occupied a small house on the current Harvard Lampoon building site on Mt. Auburn Street. In 1900, the Club was formally organized as the Kalumet Club, and moved to 1178 Massachusetts Avenue.  In 1901 it moved to 104 Mt. Auburn Street, then three years later it moved again to 44 Church Street, where it remained until its amalgamation with the Sphinx in 1914.

The adoption of the Inter-Club Agreement and other conditions made the union of these two Clubs desirable, so in 1914, members of both clubs voted that their undergraduate memberships should both join the new S K Club.  Construction was begun on a new club house on the site of the Sphinx house at 72 Mt. Auburn Street, and the Kalumet house was employed in the meantime.  The new building formally opened on April 1, 1916.

The Phoenix Club was formed in 1902 by a group of men who were members of Theta Nu Epsilon, a national sophomore society originally formed as an offshoot of Yale University's Skull and Bones. The Alpha Iota Harvard Chapter of Theta Nu Epsilon was chartered in 1895. The members of T.N.E. organized the Phoenix Club for residential and dining purposes, yet still maintained ties as the Alpha Iota Chapter to the rest of the society until 1913 when there was a division within that society. It is not known when members of the Phoenix Club ceased to meet as members of Theta Nu Epsilon. Starting in 1902, the Phoenix Club occupied a series of houses, starting with the John Hicks House at 64 Dunster Street, then in 1906 it moved to 97 Mt. Auburn Street, then in 1920 it moved again to the northeast corner of Winthrop and Holyoke Streets.

In 1925, negotiations for the amalgamation of the Phoenix and the S K were started, and in January 1925, undergraduate bodies of both clubs voted their approval.  A new club, the Phoenix – S K, was formed, which occupied the S K Club house at 72 Mt. Auburn Street.  With time, due to changing conditions within the university, it became advantageous for the Phoenix – S K to be classified as a final club, so on May 24, 1930, the Club became final.

The Accidental Billionaires, a 2009 novel by Ben Mezrich based on the founding of Facebook, references the Phoenix – S K Club punch process that Eduardo Saverin (member) participated in and Mark Zuckerberg witnessed while at Harvard. The novel was adapted into a major motion picture, The Social Network, which was released on October 1, 2010.

In 2003, the Phoenix – S K Club was investigated for animal cruelty in association with initiation rituals involving raising chickens and their potential torture, but a conclusion was never reached. The Social Network fictionally suggested that the cruelty involved animal cannibalism.

According to online sources, it appears that the club has been a hotspot for celebrities and members of Boston's local sports teams to participate in Harvard's night life. In April 2011, American musician and DJ Steve Aoki performed at the club. In February 2015, the club came back under the spotlight when pictures of New England Patriots players Julian Edelman, Danny Amendola, and several other teammates purportedly partying at the Phoenix - S K Clubhouse following their Super Bowl XLIX victory surfaced on social media.

On December 6, 2022, French Pianist Sofiane Pamart performed at the Club.

Notable members
Abbott Lawrence Lowell (1877—Honorary Member): President of Harvard University from 1909–1933
William Richards Castle, Jr. (1900): Ambassador, Assistant Secretary of State, and Under Secretary of State under Calvin Coolidge
Robert L. Bacon (1907): Banker, Lieutenant Colonel, and congressman from New York
Gaspar G. Bacon (1908): President of the Massachusetts Senate (1929–32) and Lieutenant Governor of Massachusetts (1933–1935)
Samuel Eliot Morison (1908): Rear Admiral of the U.S. Navy, three-time Pulitzer Prize Winner, Author, and recipient of the Presidential Medal of Freedom
George Gund (1909): President of Cleveland Trust Bank (1941–1962), the predecessor of KeyBank
Leverett Saltonstall (1914): American Lawyer and 55th Governor of Massachusetts; member of the Saltonstall family
Michael K. Frith (1963):  Former Executive Vice President and Creative Director for Jim Henson Productions
Nicholas Papanicolaou (1970): Co-Chairman, CEO, and Controlling Shareholder of British car manufacturer Aston Martin; Grand Master (worldwide), The Sovereign Order of Saint John of Jerusalem, Knights of Malta
Arthur Waldron (1971): Editor of Commentary Magazine
Philip Core (1973): Pioneer of gay art and writing
Jeffrey D. Dunn (1977): President and CEO of Sesame Workshop
Anand Mahindra (1978): Chairman of Mahindra & Mahindra
Buddy Fletcher (1987): Founder of Fletcher Capital Markets Inc. Impeached as President of the Phoenix-SK Club
Kris Kobach (1988): Kansas Secretary of State; Marshall Scholar; White House Fellow; political candidate
Eric Mindich (1988): Youngest partner in Goldman Sachs history at age 27 and founder of Eton Park Capital Management
Thomas L. Monahan III (1988): CEO and President, DeVry University; TransUnion Board member; ProKarma Chairman
Christopher Ford (1989): U.S. diplomat, scholar, lawyer, and federal official
Viet Dinh (1990): Former Assistant Attorney General of the U.S. (2001–2003) and architect of the USA PATRIOT Act
Kaleil Isaza Tuzman (1996): CEO of KIT digital (Nasdaq: KITD) and a featured entrepreneur of the 2001 documentary film, Startup.com
Chris Lambert (athlete) (2003): Professional Sprinter
Eduardo Saverin (2006): Co-founder of Facebook
Ryu Goto (2011): Violinist
Brandyn Curry (2013): Professional Basketball Player
Noah Gray-Cabey (2016): American television actor and pianist known for his roles in My Wife and Kids and Heroes.

Notes

See also
Collegiate secret societies in North America

Student societies in the United States
Harvard University
1895 establishments in Massachusetts